Patriarch Cosmas of Constantinople may refer to:

 Cosmas I of Constantinople, Ecumenical  Patriarch in 1075–1081
 Cosmas II of Constantinople, Ecumenical  Patriarch in 1146–1147
 Cosmas III of Constantinople, Ecumenical Patriarch in 1714–1716